Kanumuru Raghu Rama Krishna Raju (born 14 May 1962) is an Indian industrialist and politician who is serving as a Member of Parliament (MP) in the 17th Lok Sabha from Narasapuram constituency, Andhra Pradesh. He won the 2019 Indian general election as a Yuvajana Shramika Rythu Congress Party(YSRCP) candidate.

Early life 
Raghu Rama Krishna Raju was born on 14 May 1962 in Vijayawada, Andhra Pradesh to Kanumuru Venkata Satya Suryanarayana Raju and Annapoorna. He studied Master of Pharmacy at Andhra University, Visakhapatnam.

Raju married Rama Devi in 1980. The couple have a son and a daughter.

Political career 
Raghu Rama Krishna Raju is a politician from YSR Congress Party (YSRCP). He has quit the party in 2014 after not being able to secure the party's nomination for 2014 Lok Sabha elections and has joined Bharatiya Janata Party (BJP). In 2018, he quit BJP and joined Telugu Desam Party (TDP). Subsequently, in March 2019, he joined back YSRCP.

He has contested in the 2019 elections from the Narasapuram Lok Sabha constituency as a YSRCP candidate. He has won the election securing 38.11% votes polled with a majority of 31,909 votes against TDP's Vetukuri Venkata Siva Rama Raju.

Raju is an outspoken critic of his party and its chief and current chief minister, Y. S. Jagan Mohan Reddy. The differences between them were made public in November 2019 when Raju spoke out against the Andhra Pradesh government's effort to convert Telugu medium government schools to English medium. Ever since he spoke against his party and alleged scams in several government schemes.

In July 2020, YSRCP appealed to the Lok Sabha speaker to disqualify Raju from him as an MP stating Raju's anti-party activities as the reason. In October 2020, Raju wrote to Prime Minister Narendra Modi, alleging that Jaganmohan Reddy was promoting evangelism in Andhra Pradesh, in violation of the Indian constitution.

Legal issues 
In March 2021, Central Bureau of Investigation (CBI) has booked a case against Raju and his family members, who are directors of Ind Bharath Power Gencom Limited on charges of criminal conspiracy, cheating, forgery of valuable security, using forged documents as genuine and criminal misconduct of a public servant.

In April 2021, he has asked a CBI Special court to cancel the bail granted to Jagan Mohan Reddy. He alleged that the chief minister, who is on bail since 2012 on his disproportionate assets case, has violated the bail condition.

On 14 May 2021, Raju was arrested by the Andhra Pradesh Criminal Investigation Department (CID) on the charges of sedition for "disturbing communal harmony and attacking dignitaries of the Jagan Mohan Reddy government". On 21 May, the Supreme Court of India has granted him bail on a  bond, stating the charges against him did not require custodial interrogation and referred to his bodily injuries mentioned in the medical report prepared by Secunderabad Army Hospital doctors.

References

External links

India MPs 2019–present
 Lok Sabha members from Andhra Pradesh
 Living people
YSR Congress Party politicians
1962 births
 People from West Godavari district
 Telugu Desam Party politicians
 Bharatiya Janata Party politicians from Andhra Pradesh
 Telugu politicians
 Andhra University alumni